Tragulichthys jaculiferus also known as  the longspine burrfish, is a species of porcupinefish native to the Indo-Pacific where it occurs in reef environments at depths of from . This species grows to a length of  TL. This species is the only known member of its genus.

References

Diodontidae
Taxa named by Georges Cuvier
Fish described in 1818